San Juan de la Maguana Airport is an airport that serves San Juan de la Maguana, in the southwest of the Dominican Republic. It is mostly for charter service, emergency landing or private flights into the country.

References 

Airports in the Dominican Republic
Buildings and structures in San Juan Province (Dominican Republic)